Cachalot (1980) is a science fiction novel by American writer Alan Dean Foster.

Plot summary

Cachalot is an ocean planet where humans have begun building floating cities. It is also the same planet where all of Earth's cetaceans were transplanted six hundred years ago after the Covenant of Peace was enacted with all intelligence-enhanced ocean dwellers. Four of these cities have been destroyed when a middle-aged scientist and her late-teen daughter are dispatched to the planet to discover the source of the attacks.

The novel title comes from the French word cachalot, meaning sperm whale. This word was applied to the sperm whale when the mammals were actively hunted in Earth's oceans.

The novel features a new musical instrument called "neurophon" producing not only tunes but also nerve sensations on human skin and irritating alien creatures found on the planet.

External links

Alan Dean Foster homepage

1980 American novels
Humanx Commonwealth
Novels by Alan Dean Foster
1980 science fiction novels
American science fiction novels
Del Rey books
Fiction about whales
Fiction set on ocean planets